Hans-Günther Hilker (15 May 1932 – 12 June 2005) was a German water polo player. He competed in the men's tournament at the 1956 Summer Olympics.

References

1932 births
2005 deaths
German male water polo players
Olympic water polo players of the United Team of Germany
Water polo players at the 1956 Summer Olympics
Sportspeople from Duisburg